Coravin, Inc. is a company based in Burlington, Massachusetts, that manufactures products for the wine industry. Its first product, the Coravin Wine Preservation Opener, pours wine without removing the cork from the bottle.

History 
The opener was invented by Greg Lambrecht, who founded Coravin in 2011 with Josh Makower. Nick Lazaris, the former CEO of Keurig, joined as CEO in 2013 and was succeeded in February 2015 by Frederic Levy.

Coravin Wine Preservation Opener 
The Coravin Wine Preservation Opener uses a hollowed needle, which is inserted through the cork and fills the bottle with argon gas to pressurize it, and the wine, in turn, is poured through the needle. When the needle is removed from the cork, the cork reseals, protecting the wine from oxidation and leaving the remaining wine unaffected. The Coravin Model 11 is automated, paired with an app that records how much argon remains. The opener has been widely adopted by restaurants, wine salespeople, and wine reviewers, since it makes it possible to sample or drink only one glass from a bottle without then having to finish it immediately, but wine writer Jamie Goode suggested in 2021 that the argon might subtly alter the wine and that reviewers using a Coravin opener should therefore declare that fact.

By June 2014, 13 complaints had been made of broken bottles following use of the Coravin opener. Lambrecht estimated that only 1 in 70,000 bottles will break, attributing the issue to bottles that have been dropped and cracked. In response to the complaints, Coravin sent purchasers a neoprene protective sleeve to cover the bottles.

Awards 
The Coravin Wine Preservation Opener has been nominated for and won awards for innovation or technology.
 November 2013: Popular Sciences “Best of What’s New” in the Home category.
 December 2013: La Revue du vin de Frances  award for “the most innovative product in the world of wine” for 2013.

See also

Wine accessory	
Wine tasting

References

External links

  		  	
Manufacturing companies based in Massachusetts
Wine accessories
Companies established in 2011